The following were the events of Volleyball for the year 2013 throughout the world.

Beach volleyball
April 23 – December 15: 2013 FIVB Beach Volleyball Open Series
 April 23 – 28 at  Fuzhou
 Men's winners:  Sean Rosenthal and Philip Dalhausser
 Women's winners:  Xue Chen and Zhang Xi
 July 23 – 28 at  Anapa
 Men's winners:  Konstantin Semenov and Yaroslav Koshkarev
 Women's winners:  Evgenia Ukolova and Ekaterina Khomyakova
 October 29 – November 3 at  Phuket (women's teams only)
 Winners:  Xue Chen and Xia Xinyi
 December 11 – 15 at  Durban
Men's winners:  Jānis Šmēdiņš and Aleksandrs Samoilovs
Women's winners:  Xue Chen and Xia Xinyi
April 30 – October 27: FIVB Beach Volleyball World Tour
 April 30 – May 5 at  Shanghai
Men's winners:  Jacob Gibb and Casey Patterson
Women's winners:  Talita Antunes and Taiana Lima
 May 22 – 26 at  Corrientes
Men's winners:  Jānis Šmēdiņš and Aleksandrs Samoilovs
Women's winners:  Madelein Meppelink and Sophie van Gestel
 June 11 – 16 at  The Hague
Men's winners:  Pedro Solberg Salgado and Bruno Oscar Schmidt
Women's winners:  Talita Antunes and Taiana Lima
 June 18 – 23 at  Rome
Men's winners:  Phil Dalhausser and Sean Rosenthal
Women's winners:  Talita Antunes and Taiana Lima
 July 9 – 14 at  Gstaad
Men's winners:  Ricardo Santos and Álvaro Morais Filho
Women's winners:  Xue Chen and Zhang Xi
 July 22 – 27 at  Long Beach
Men's winners:  Sean Rosenthal and Phil Dalhausser
Women's winners:  Taiana Lima and Talita Antunes
 August 6 – 11 at  Berlin
Men's winners:  Vítor Gonçalves Felipe and Evandro Gonçalves Oliveira Júnior
Women's winners:  Taiana Lima and Talita Antunes
 August 21 – 25 at  Moscow
Men's winners:  Jānis Šmēdiņš and Aleksandrs Samoilovs
Women's winners:  Maria Clara Salgado Rufino and Carolina Solberg Salgado
 October 8 – 13 at  São Paulo
Men's winners:  Pedro Solberg Salgado and Bruno Oscar Schmidt
Women's winners:  Kerri Walsh and April Ross
 October 22 – 27 at  Xiamen
Men's winners:  Alison Cerutti and Vítor Gonçalves Felipe
Women's winners:  Kerri Walsh and April Ross
May 29 – June 2: 2013 FIVB Beach Volleyball World Cup Final at  Campinas
Men's winners:  Alison Cerutti and Emanuel Rego
Women's winners:  Maria Antonelli and Talita Antunes
June 6 – 9: 2013 FIVB Beach Volleyball U23 World Championships at  Mysłowice
Men's winners:  Piotr Kantor and Bartosz Losiak
Women's winners:  Victoria Bieneck and Isabell Schneider
June 20 – 23: 2013 FIVB Beach Volleyball U21 World Championships at  Umag
Men's winners:  Gustavo Albrecht Carvalhaes and Allison Cittadin Francioni
Women's winners:  Katarzyna Kociolek and Jagoda Gruszczynska
July 1 – 7: 2013 Beach Volleyball World Championships in  Stare Jabłonki
Men's winners:  Alexander Brouwer and Robert Meeuwsen
Women's winners:  Xue Chen and Xi Zhang
July 11 – 14: 2013 FIVB Beach Volleyball U19 World Championships at  Porto
Men's winners:  Moritz Reichert and Clemens Wickler
Women's winners:  Eduarda Santos Lisboa and TAINÁ SILVA BIGI

Volleyball
Cev Women's Champions League. October 2012 – March 2013. Final Four in Istanbul, Turkey
 VakıfBank gained the second European title against  Rabita Baku. MVP:  Jovana Brakočević.
Cev Champions League. October 2012 – March 2013. Final Four in Omsk, Russia.
  Lokomotiv Novosibirsk edged  Bre Banca Cuneo by the score of 3–2 to win their first European crown. MVP:  Marcus Nilsson
 May 31 – July 21: 2013 FIVB Volleyball World League (final round will take place in  Mar del Plata)
 Champions: ; Second: ; Third: 
 June 21 – 30: 2013 FIVB Women's Junior World Championship in  Brno
 Champions: ; Second: ; Third: 
 June 27 – July 7: 2013 FIVB Boys Youth World Championship in  Tijuana and Mexicali
 Champions: ; Second: ; Third: 
 July 26 – August 4: 2013 FIVB Girls Youth World Championship in  Nakhon Ratchasima
 Champions: ; Second: ; Third: 
 August 28 – September 1: 2013 FIVB World Grand Prix (final round will take place in  Sapporo)
Champions: ; Second: ; Third: . 9th title for Brazil. 
 August 22 – September 1: 2013 FIVB Men's Junior World Championship in  Ankara and Izmir
Champions: ; Second: ; Third: .
 September 6 – 14: 2013 Women's European Volleyball Championship in Germany and Switzerland
Champions: ; Second: ; Third: . 18th title for Russia.
 September 20 – 29: 2013 Men's European Volleyball Championship in Poland and Denmark
Champions: ; Second: ; Third: . 13th title for Russia.
 October 5 – 12: 2013 FIVB Women's U23 Volleyball World Championship in Mexico
Champions: ; Second: ; Third: . First title.
 October 6 – 13: 2013 FIVB Men's U23 Volleyball World Championship in Brazil
Champions: ; Second: ; Third: . First title.
 November 12 – 17: 2013 FIVB Women's World Grand Champions Cup for Women in Japan
Champions: ; Second: ; Third: . Second title.
 November 19 – 24: 2013 FIVB World Grand Champions Cup for Men in Japan
Champions: ; Second: ; Third: . Fourth title.

Volleyball Hall of Fame
Class of 2013: 
Vyacheslav Zaytsev
Natalie Cook
Caren Kemner

References

 
 
Volleyball by year